The Mastuj Fort is a fortification in Mastuj city, Khyber Pakhtunkhwa, Pakistan. The fort is situated on a plateau at confluence of the Yarkhun River and the Mastuj River near Shandur Pass.

The fort is believed to be built by Katoor Dynasty in 18th century in around 1780 with couple of rebuilds in 1830 and 1920s.

See also
 Chitral (princely state)
 Chitral Fort

References

Forts in Khyber Pakhtunkhwa
Chitral District
History of Chitral